Václav Milík may refer to:
Václav Milík Sr. (born 1960), former Czechoslovakian and Czech speedway rider
Václav Milík Jr. (born 1993), Czech speedway rider